John Wilder may refer to:

 John T. Wilder (1830–1917), American soldier and politician 
 John Shelton Wilder (1921–2010), American politician, lieutenant governor of Tennessee